The IMAM Ro.30 was a 1930s Italian observation biplane designed and built by Industrie Meccaniche e Aeronautiche Meridionali. It was only built in limited numbers before being replaced by the Ro.37.

Development
Following the success of earlier observation biplanes the Ro.30 was developed in 1932 for the Regia Aeronautica. It was an unequal-span biplane  with a fixed tailwheel landing gear. It had an enclosed cockpit for the pilot located forward of the wing leading edge, an observer had a cabin between the wings, and the third crew member had an open cockpit behind the wings. It was powered either a 395 kW (530 hp) Alfa Romeo Mercury or a 373 kW (530 hp) Piaggio Jupiter radial engine.

Operators

Regia Aeronautica

Specifications (Ro.30 with Jupiter engine)

See also

References

 The Illustrated Encyclopedia of Aircraft (Part Work 1982-1985), 1985, Orbis Publishing, Page 2193

Ro.30
1930s Italian military reconnaissance aircraft
Biplanes
Aircraft first flown in 1932